Chilula (Yurok language term: Chueluela' / Chueluelaa' , Tsulu-la, "People of Tsulu, the Bald Hill", locally known as the "Bald Hills Indians") were a Pacific Coast Athabaskan tribe speaking a dialect similar to the Hupa to the east and Whilkut to the south, who inhabited the area on or near Lower Redwood Creek, in Northern California, some 500 to 600 years before contact with Europeans. 

Upstream and northwest of the Whilkut along the Lower Redwood Creek lived the Chilula; they established their more than 20 villages only along the eastern shore, because there the mountains were broken by valleys irrigated by small streams, while the western shore was difficult to access.  

The Chilula (together with Whilkut) were called by the neighboring Hupa-speaking peoples Xwiy¬q'it-xwe / Xwe:yłq'it-xwe ("Redwood Ridge / Bald Hills People"), the Karuk also called them Vitkirik'áraar ("People of Viitkírik/Viitkírak (Bald Hills)"), therefore they were also known as Bald Hills Indians or Lower Redwood Indians. Because of their close Hupa kin they are also called Lower Redwood Creek Hupa or Downstream Redwood Creek Hupa. Sometimes they are also considered another fourth tribelet (subgroup) of the Whilkut and are called the Chilula Whilkut.

Chilula descendants have since been incorporated into the Hupa: 

 Hoopa Valley Tribe (Hoopa, Humboldt County, Population 2013: 3.139) (Hupa, Tsnungwe, Chimalakwe, Chilula, Whilkut)
 Moon Creek Corporation (Redwood Creek Descendants)

Historic villages
Groups of Chilula Indians lived in small villages scattered throughout the area, each containing about thirty people. The Chilula originally had at least 20 villages. Alfred Kroeber identified the locations and names of 18 of these; his spellings are in parenthesis.

 k'ina'-xontah-ding (Kinahontahding)
 kinyiq'i-kyoh-mingwah (Kingyukyomunga)
 łich'iwh-'inahwh-ding (Hlichuhwinauhwding)
 mis-me' (Misme)
 noleh-ding (Noleding)
 q'a: xis-tah-ding (Kahustahding)
 q'ayliwh-tah-ding (Kailuhwtahding)
 q'ung'-kyoh-lay' (Kingkyolai)
 sikinchwin-mitah-ding (Sikinchwungmitahding)
 to:n'-dinun-ding (Tondinunding)
 ts'in-sila: -ding (Tsinsilading)
 xontehł-me' (Hontetlme)
 xowuni-q'it (Howunakut)
 yinuqi-no:mitse'-ding (Yinukanomitseding)
 yitse'ni-ning'ay-q'it (Yisining'aikut)
 (Kailuhwchengetlding)
 (Tlochime)
 (Tlocheke)

Most of these settlements were on the east side of Redwood Creek.  It was sunnier there and the trees less dense.  The Chilulas also had temporary camps on Bald Hills, where they stayed during the summer and fall. They usually chose sites high on a ridge near a cool brook or stream.  The Chilula's permanent homes in Redwood Creek basin were square structures made of redwood slabs.  Small pieces of leftover wood were used to make drum frames, medicine boxes, and other items.  The houses were built over dug-out pits.  A notched plank served as a stairway leading down to them.  Near the pit's center, a scooped-out area bordered by stones was used for fire.

Legacy

See also
Population of Native California
Native Americans in California

References

 Chilula Bibliography, from California Indian Library Collections Project

 Goddard, Pliny Earle. Notes on the Chilula Indians of Northwestern California. University of California Publications in American Archaeology and Ethnology, vol. 10, no. 6. Berkeley: University of California Press, 1914.
 Lake, Robert G. Chilula: People from the Ancient Redwoods. Washington, D.C.: University Press of America, 1982. 

Hupa
Native American tribes in California
Native Americans in Humboldt County, California
Bald Hills War